Mukuria railway station is a railway station on the Howrah–New Jalpaiguri line of Katihar railway division of Northeast Frontier Railway zone. It is situated at Mukuria of Katihar district in the Indian state of Bihar.

References

Railway stations in Katihar district
Katihar railway division